Malečov is a municipality and village in Ústí nad Labem District in the Ústí nad Labem Region of the Czech Republic. It has about 900 inhabitants.

Administrative parts
Villages and hamlets of Babiny I, Březí, Čeřeniště, Horní Zálezly, Němčí, Pohoří, Proboštov, Řetouň and Rýdeč  are administrative parts of Malečov.

References

Villages in Ústí nad Labem District